The 2021–22 Saudi Third Division was the inaugural season of the Saudi Third Division, the newly introduced fourth tier of Saudi football. The season started on 28 October 2021 and concluded with the final on 19 March 2022. The group stage draw was held on 7 June 2021. The league was made up of 32 teams, 4 relegated teams from the 2020–21 Saudi Second Division and the 28 teams that qualified for the Round of 32 of the 2020–21 Saudi Third Division. 

The final was played on 19 March 2022 between Al-Qous and Al-Suqoor. Al-Suqoor defeated Al-Qous 2–1 to become the inaugural champions.

Overview

Background 
On 9 October 2020, the Saudi FF announced the introduction of the Saudi Third Division starting from the 2021–22 season. The newly introduced league would replace the Regional Leagues as the fourth tier of the Saudi football league system. They announced that the league would comprise 32 teams, the 28 teams that had qualified to the round of 32 of the Regional Leagues and did not achieve promotion to the 2021–22 Saudi Second Division and the 4 relegated teams from the 2020–21 Saudi Second Division. 

The 32 teams would be split into 4 groups of 8 teams, with the winners of each group qualifying for the championship play-offs. In addition, the 4 group runners-up would also qualify for the promotion play-offs. The best runner-up would face the worst runner-up and the second best would face the third best. The winners from both matches would also earn promotion to the Second Division. As for which teams would get relegated, the last-placed team of each group would be the one to get relegated.

Teams
;Group A

Group B

Group C

Group D

Group A

League table

Results

Group B

League table

Results

Group C

League table

Results

Group D

League table

Results

Play-offs

Championship play-offs

Semi-finals

Final

Promotion play-offs

0–0 on aggregate. Qilwah won 8–7 on penalties.

Al-Shaeib won 3–1 on aggregate.

Statistics

Top scorers

Hat-tricks 

Note
(H) – Home; (A) – Away

Number of teams by province

See also
 2021–22 Saudi Professional League
 2021–22 Saudi First Division League
 2021–22 Saudi Second Division

References

4
Saudi Third Division seasons